Redbooth (formerly Teambox) is a web-based workplace collaboration tool and communication platform.

History
Redbooth, previously known as Teambox Technologies S.L., who developed Teambox, was founded in 2008 and continued to serve commercial and free hosting for Teambox. The company also offered installation and customization of the software.

In February 2010, Teambox secured $193,400 (€140,000) and an additional US$250,000 as part of a seed funding round in November 2010. In April 2010, Canadian internet company Talker announced that it had been acquired by Teambox. In June 2013, Teambox partnered with Zoom Video Communications to provide HD videoconferencing to its users.

On 21 January 2014, after gaining 650,000 users, Teambox was renamed to "Redbooth, Inc.". Later that year, on 18 November 2014, Redbooth announces a $11 million Series B round, led by Altpoint Ventures and Avalon Ventures. Redbooth's total funding was brought to $17.5 million.

In August 2016, Redbooth released an exclusive app for Apple TV, it is now available in the Apple TV App Store.

On 13 September 2017, Redbooth announced that it had merged with AeroFS, a company that develops collaboration applications. The new combined company is called Redbooth, and products from both companies will be supported going forward.

Features
 Status updates and conversations — Status updates are registered as projects' conversations. You can later organize conversations by giving them headlines. There are options to notify other project members via email and to attach files from one's computer or Google Docs.
 Task management – Tasks are organized into task lists under the projects. The task system is very closely related to the conversation system and conversations can be converted to tasks. Tasks' status can be changed when commenting it. There is time tracking, delegation and due date properties for tasks.
 File and content management: Easily share, find and work on current documents. Comes with free file storage and integrates with: Dropbox, Box, Google Drive
 Real-time communication: HD Video conferencing for up to 100 people, screen sharing, and group chat to communicate with your team in real time.
 Role-based permission to access to projects
 Integration with other systems (CRM, ERP, etc.)
 HD Video conferencing 
 Pages — Pages are a wiki type documentation feature.
 Discussion forums
 Chat
 Contacts on the project
 Time tracking — Time spent on tasks can be tracked
 Phone and tablet clients for iOS and Android
 Language support for English, French, German, Italian, Spanish, Portuguese, Simplified Chinese, and Japanese.

See also
 List of collaborative software
 Comparison of project management software

References

External links
 
Teambox on GitHub

Project management software
Free software programmed in Ruby
Software using the GNU AGPL license